Gorenja Kanomlja is a dispersed settlement in the hills northwest of Idrija in the traditional Inner Carniola region of Slovenia.

References

External links

Gorenja Kanomlja on Geopedia

Populated places in the Municipality of Idrija